K-1 is a , north-south state highway in southern Comanche County, Kansas, United States, that connects Oklahoma State Highway 34 (SH‑34),with U.S. Route 160/U.S. Route 183 (US‑160/US‑183).

Route description

K-1 begins at the Oklahoma state line, where it is a continuation of Oklahoma State Highway 34. From its southern terminus it heads in north, turning slightly to the northwest before heading directly north again. It passes through the unincorporated community of Buttermilk, which is the only community on the route. From Buttermilk, K-1 continues north until it reaches it northern terminus at an intersection with US‑160/US‑183, south of Coldwater. US‑160/US‑183 continues north to Coldwater and west to Protection.

The entire route of K-1 is paved with partial design bituminous pavement, a type of bituminous pavement which is not designed or constructed to carry the highway's expected traffic. Annual average daily traffic values for the highway rise slowly from 600 over the southernmost  of the route to 645 over the northernmost  of the route. K-1 highway is not a part of the United States National Highway System.

History
K‑1 highway was originally established sometime between 1918 and 1932. Originally, it ran much farther to the north than its current terminus, passing from the Oklahoma–Kansas border south of Coldwater north through Greensburg, Kinsley, western sections of Pawnee County, La Crosse, Hays, Plainville, Stockton, and Phillipsburg to a northern terminus just northeast of the town of Woodruff. It terminated at K-22, which was later known as U.S. Route 83, close to the border with Nebraska. In 1941, the majority of K‑1 (except the southernmost section) began to be replaced with US‑183, beginning with the section between Rozel and Plainville. By 1950, US‑183 had replaced all but the current alignment of K‑1. It was not until 1953 that the entirety of K-1 was paved, as the section of K-1 that comprises the current alignment was not paved until between 1950 and 1953. Since 1953, K-1 has remained at its current alignment.

Major intersections

See also

 List of state highways in Kansas
 List of highways numbered 1

References

External links

 Information at route56.com

001
U.S. Route 83
Transportation in Comanche County, Kansas